This is a list of characters in The Shapeshifter, a series written by Ali Sparkes about Dax Jones (The Shapeshifter) and his supernatural friends, the Children Of Limitless Abilities, or COLAs. The series features many characters as well as an initial 111 COLAs who are mainly unnamed with the exception of the True 11 and a few others.

Main characters

Daxesh "Dax" Robert Jones
Dax Jones, referred to as just Dax, is the main character of the series and 'The Shapeshifter'. He is one of the last of the COLAs to be found by Owen and the only shapshifter excepting the deceased 'Wolf Boy'. Dax first discovers his powers when locking in a boiling shed surrounded by the smell of white spirit this is a substance known as triple 8 it causes panic . This causes him to shapeshift into a fox, his first form, in order to get his head out the shed and breathe.

From then on Dax is The Shapeshifter and it is not long before Owen (one of the COLA club teachers and the man Dax looks up to most in the world) comes to get him; using a liquid known as the 'triple eight' to panic Dax into Shapeshifting in the shed. Soon after (Once Owen has explained and apologised) Dax is whisked away to Tregarren College to meet the other COLAs and become one of the students, the only Shapeshifter after the death of wolf boy.

Many events unfold after this leading into another four books, five in total in which Dax develops his shapeshifting skills. Throughout the events of the five books we eventually learn that a Shapeshifter can take on only three forms and that Dax's mum an effective 'alien' was also a shapeshifter. Dax can become three different animals by the end of the five book; these being:

Fox – Dax's most natural form. The first he achieved and his favourite.
Peregrine falcon – Dax's second form, achieved when he is trapped in a cave behind a grill as a fox, and the wolf spirit tells him to 'take it to the wing'. He shifts into a falcon.
Otter – Dax's third and last form. He finds this out when he dives into the Atlantic Ocean during the final battle with Catherine in the fifth book.

Gideon Michael Reader
Telekinetic.

Lisa Hardman
Clairvoyant, dowser, medium.

Lisa Hardman is a very stubborn and strong-willed teenage girl, who (at the beginning of the story) is very reluctant to accept her powers. After forming a steady relationship with Dax, she begins to learn to accept and use her powers. She is one of the few teenagers who come from a rich home, and loves her father very much.

Mia Cooper
Healer, pyrokinetic.

References

Lists of literary characters
Characters in children's literature
Characters